Rowe Nunataks is a cluster of nunataks 3 nautical miles (6 km) northwest of Cape Beck in the southwest part of Black Island, Ross Archipelago. Named by Advisory Committee on Antarctic Names (US-ACAN) (1999) after Charlotte A. Rowe, Geophysical Institute, University of Alaska, Fairbanks, who investigated volcanic activity and seismicity at nearby Mount Erebus, 1984–85 and 1985–86.

Nunataks of the Ross Dependency
Black Island (Ross Archipelago)